Ishmael Mukuwanda is an Anglican bishop in Zimbabwe: he was Bishop of Central Zimbabwe until 2018 when he was succeeded by Ignatius Makumbe.

References

Anglican bishops of Central Zimbabwe
21st-century Anglican bishops in Africa
Year of birth missing (living people)
Living people